Wenzel J. Beierlein (June 3, 1891 – December 1983)  was an American politician in the state of Washington. He served in the Washington House of Representatives from 1939 to 1965.

References

1891 births
1983 deaths
Democratic Party members of the Washington House of Representatives
20th-century American politicians